Atomic Energy Act is a stock short title used for legislation in the United Kingdom and the United States relating to nuclear power and, or alternatively, nuclear weapons production.

The Bill for an Act with this short title will have been known as an Atomic Energy Bill during its passage through the Parliament of the United Kingdom.

See also Atomic Energy Authority Act.

List

United Kingdom
The Atomic Energy Act 1946 (c. 80) 
The Atomic Energy (Miscellaneous Provisions) Act 1981 (c. 48) 
The Atomic Energy Act 1989 (c. 7)
Atomic Energy Authority Act 1959 (c. 5)
Atomic Energy Authority Act 1954 (c. 32)

United States
In the United States, there are two federal laws known by the name:
 The United States Atomic Energy Act of 1946 – first legislation governing nuclear weapons and nuclear power in the United States
 The United States Atomic Energy Act of 1954 – a substantial amendment to the 1946 statute.

See also
 Energy law
List of short titles

Lists of legislation by short title
Energy law